Krag Peak is a mountain summit located in Baker County, Oregon, US.

Description

Krag Peak is located in the southern Wallowa Mountains. The double summit peak is situated within the Eagle Cap Wilderness on land managed by Wallowa–Whitman National Forest. The  summit and slightly lower northwest peak (9,048 ft) ranks as the 42nd-highest mountain in Oregon, and third-highest in Baker County following Red Mountain and Rock Creek Butte. It ranks tied for 27th-highest in Oregon when 500-foot minimum topographic prominence is included as criteria. Precipitation runoff from the mountain drains west into East Fork Eagle Creek, and east to the Imnaha River via Cliff Creek. This landform's toponym has been officially adopted by the United States Board on Geographic Names.

Climate

Based on the Köppen climate classification, Krag Peak is located in a subarctic climate zone characterized by long, usually very cold winters, and mild summers. Winter temperatures can drop below −10 °F with wind chill factors below −20 °F. Most precipitation in the area is caused by orographic lift. Thunderstorms are common in the summer.

See also
 List of mountain peaks of Oregon

Gallery

References

External links

 Weather forecast: Krag Peak
 Krag Peak (photo): Flickr

Mountains of Oregon
Landforms of Baker County, Oregon
North American 2000 m summits
Wallowa–Whitman National Forest